Ras Filuk, also known as Cape Elephant, is a headland in the northeastern Bari province of Somalia. It is situated in the autonomous Puntland region.

Etymology
Ras Filuk (or Ras Fil) means the Head of the Elephant in Arabic. Alternatively it is known as Jebel Fil, which translates into Mount Elephant (Jebel meaning mountain in Arabic).

Location
It lies 39 nautical miles (45 miles) west of Cape Guardafui, 7 nautical miles (8 miles) west of Alula and 52 nautical miles (60 miles) east of Qandala.

History
Ras Filuk has, on account of its steep cliffwalls jutting into the Gulf of Aden, been a prominent geographical feature for vessels passing the tip of the Horn of Africa. It is quite likely the Elephas Mons of antiquity.

On April 8, 2013, the Puntland government announced the creation of a new region coextensive with Ras Filuk and Cape Guardafui, named Gardafuul. Carved out of the Bari region, it consists of three districts and has its capital at Alula.

See also
Maritime history of Somalia
Geography of Somalia

References

Bari, Somalia
Headlands of Somalia